Brian Duffy may refer to:
 Brian Duffy (astronaut) (born 1953), American astronaut
 Brian Duffy (chef), celebrity chef
 Brian Duffy (photographer) (1933–2010), English photographer
 Brian John Duffy better known as Jet Black (1938–2022), drummer for The Stranglers
 Brian Duffy (actor), Scottish actor, writer, and artist
 Brian Duffy (weightlifter), New Zealand weightlifter